Kristina Clonan (born 13 April 1998) is an Australian professional racing cyclist. She rode in the women's scratch event at the 2017 UCI Track Cycling World Championships.

Major results

2015
1st  Road Race, Oceania Junior Road Championships
3rd Time Trial, Oceania Junior Road Championships
2017
1st 120th Austral Wheel Race
1st Omnium, ITS Melbourne - Hisense Grand Prix 
National Track Championships
1st  Madison (with Macey Stewart)
2nd Team Pursuit
2nd Omnium, ITS Melbourne - DISC Grand Prix
2018
Australian National Road Championships
1st  U23 Criterium
3rd U23 Road Race

References

External links
 
 

1998 births
Living people
Australian female cyclists
Place of birth missing (living people)
20th-century Australian women
21st-century Australian women
Cyclists at the 2022 Commonwealth Games
Commonwealth Games competitors for Australia
Commonwealth Games gold medallists for Australia
Commonwealth Games medallists in cycling
Medallists at the 2022 Commonwealth Games